Kagaar: Life on the Edge is a 2003 Indian Hindi-language crime drama film starring Om Puri, Nandita Das, Amitabh Dayal, Anup Soni. The film was directed by N. Chandra and produced by Mrunalinni Patil, with Vishal Bhardwaj as music director.

The film is based on the true life story of a Mumbai cop, encounter specialist sub-inspector Daya Nayak, who has been given special thanks in thefilm's credits.Amitabh Dayal makes his debut as sub-inspector Bhaskar Sarnaik in this flick, which is inspired by the life of encounter expert Daya Nayak.

Synopsis 
Naive, simple-minded, and illiterate Bhaskar Sarnaik comes to Bombay from his far-off village, to look for his missing brother, Raghuvir. He comes in contact with Sub-Inspector Gokhale, who feels sorry for him, and not only offers to find his brother, but also employment at an Irani Restaurant. Bhaskar does find his brother - in the morgue - but decides not to tell his mother as this may break her heart. He decides to stay on in Bombay and undergoes training to become a police officer. A short time later he is also a Sub-Inspector working closely with Gokhale. He is wounded in an encounter, and his mother comes to look after, and gets him to marry Aditi (Nandita Das) from the same village, which Bhaskar does so. Then the police must hunt for Adi, a notorious hit-man. When Bhaskar comes face to face with Adi, he does not shoot him, and as a result Adi escapes. Adi then gives an interview on television that he is the child-hood friend of Bhaskar, and that he would never be shot at by Bhaskar. As a result, Bhaskar gets suspended from service, and becomes the subject of an intensive investigation by the Crime Branch, who are now convinced that Bhaskar is on the pay-roll of Adi and other underworld elements.

Cast

 Om Puri as Sub-Inspector Gokhle
 Nandita Das as Aditi
 Amitabh Dayal as Bhaskar Sarnaik
 Anup Soni as Adi
 Dinyar Tirandas as Rustom
 Aditya Kotdar

Reception
Lata Khubchandani of India Syndicate wrote ″Uncompromisingly brutal, this is an awesome close up of lives that are laid on the line, of men and women living on a double-edged sword. This film shows that truth is often stranger than fiction. It promises to be a disturbing and most significant film. N Chandra attempts to make a different film. Produced by Dr Mrunalinni and Smt Suryakant Patil, Kagaar has music by Vishal Bharadwaj. Gulzar has penned the lyrics. Watch out for another police drama which also dwells upon the life of a cop, his sacrifices and his urge to do his duties well.″

References

External links
 

2003 films
2000s Hindi-language films
Films directed by N. Chandra
Films scored by Vishal Bhardwaj